Pachypaederus is a genus of small beetles of the family Staphylinidae ("rove beetles").

Notes

References 
 ION –  Pachypaederus
 Nomenclator Zoologicus – Pachypaederus

Staphylinidae genera
Paederinae